Amy Daniels (born August 8, 1980) is an American rugby union player. She started playing rugby in college when she came to a game as a spectator but ended up playing in that match. She made her debut for the  Eagles against  in August 2009. Daniels also played in the 2012 Hong Kong Women's Sevens as a member of the US women's sevens team.

References

External links
 https://web.archive.org/web/20111002003209/http://web.usarugby.org/cgi-bin/viadesto/natteams/wnt/15ProfileDetail.pl?playerId=292

1980 births
Living people
United States women's international rugby union players
American female rugby union players
Sportspeople from Harrisburg, Pennsylvania
21st-century American women
American female rugby sevens players